James C. "Jim" Collins (born 1958) is an American researcher, author, speaker and consultant focused on the subject of business management and company sustainability and growth.

Biography 
Collins received a BS in Mathematical Sciences at Stanford University, graduating in 1980.

He then spent 18 months in McKinsey & Co.'s San Francisco office. He was exposed to what may have been an influential project for him – two partners at McKinsey, Tom Peters and Robert Waterman, were running a McKinsey research project that later turned into the best-seller In Search of Excellence.

After his time at McKinsey, he returned to study at Stanford, graduating with an MBA from the Stanford Graduate School of Business in 1983. 

He then worked as a product manager for Hewlett-Packard for 18 months, before quitting to help manage his wife's ascending triathlon career.

Collins began his research and teaching career on the faculty at Stanford University's Graduate School of Business in 1988, where he received the Distinguished Teaching Award in 1992.

He published his first book, Beyond Entrepreneurship: Turning Your Business into an Enduring Great Company co-authored with William C. Lazier, in 1992.

He published his first best-seller Built To Last, co-authored with Jerry Porras, in 1994.

In 1995, he founded a management laboratory in Boulder, Colorado, where he now conducts research and teaches executives from the corporate and social sectors. During that time, Collins has served as a senior executive at CNN International, and also worked with social sector organizations, such as: Johns Hopkins School of Medicine, the Girl Scouts of the USA, the Leadership Network of Churches, the American Association of K-12 School Superintendents, and the United States Marine Corps.

Collins is married to former triathlete and 1985 Ironman World Championship winner, Joanne Ernst.

Work

Research and writing 
Collins has authored or co-authored six books based on his research, including the classics:

Built to Last: Successful Habits of Visionary Companies
Good to Great
Great by Choice
How the Mighty Fall: And Why Some Companies Never Give In

Built to Last has been a fixture on the Business Week best-seller list for more than six years, and has been translated into 25 languages. 

Good to Great, "about the factors common to those few companies  ...  to sustain remarkable success for a substantial period," attained long-running positions on the New York Times, Wall Street Journal and Business Week best-seller lists, has sold over 2.5 million hardcover copies, and has been translated into 32 languages.

His most recent book is Great by Choice.

Before that he wrote How the Mighty Fall: And Why Some Companies Never Give In. 

Collins frequently contributes to Harvard Business Review, Business Week, Fortune and other publications.

Consulting

Jim Collins is also a speaker, consultant, and seminar leader.

Publications 

Books
 1992: Beyond Entrepreneurship: Turning Your Business into an Enduring Great Company by James C. Collins and William C. Lazier 
 1994: Built to Last: Successful Habits of Visionary Companies by James C. Collins and Jerry I. Porras 
 2001: Good to Great: Why Some Companies Make the Leap … And Others Don’t by James C. Collins 
 2005: Good to Great and the Social Sectors by James C. Collins 
 2009: How the Mighty Fall: And Why Some Companies Never Give In by James C. Collins
 2011: Great By Choice by James C. Collins and Morten T. Hansen
 2019: Turning the Flywheel: A Monograph to Accompany Good to Great by James C. Collins
 2020: BE 2.0 (Beyond Entrepreneurship 2.0): Turning Your Business into an Enduring Great Company by James C. Collins and William C. Lazier

References

External links

 

1958 births
Living people
American business and financial journalists
American male journalists
American business theorists
American business writers
American columnists
American businesspeople
Hewlett-Packard people
McKinsey & Company people
People from Aurora, Colorado
Stanford University alumni
Stanford University Graduate School of Business faculty
Writers from Boulder, Colorado